The National Cricket Stadium, is the name of a cricket stadium complex on River Road, Grenada in the Caribbean. A Grenada cricket team first appeared in West Indian cricket in 1887, against a touring Gentlemen of America team at the old Queen's Park. Ten years later the team was recorded playing against Lord Hawke's touring team. Although, unlike several matches during the tour, that match did not have first-class status. In 1899, G. A. de Freitas and William Mignon became the first Grenada cricketers to play first-class cricket.

The newly rebuilt Queen's Park Stadium became the 84th Test venue in 2002 when it hosted its first match between the West Indies and New Zealand. , two test matches have taken place at the ground. It was one of the locations for the 2007 Cricket World Cup.

After being rebuilt in 2000, the new complex was damaged in September 2004, as a result of Hurricane Ivan.

The oval is noted for being elongated towards the Pavilion end, giving a more baseball type look to the ground. The stadium was funded by the People's Republic of China.

List of Five Wicket Hauls

Tests
Four five wicket hauls in Test matches have been taken at the venue.

One Day Internationals
Three five wicket hauls in One-Day Internationals have been taken at the venue.

See also
2007 cricket World Cup
List of Test cricket grounds

References

External links
Hurricane Destroys Grenada Stadium News article at caribbeancricket.com
 CricketArchive

Cricket grounds in Grenada
Test cricket grounds in the West Indies
2007 Cricket World Cup stadiums

de:Grenada National Stadium